The National Trust is a conservation organisation in England, Wales and Northern Ireland.

National Trust may also refer to:
 National trust, an organisation that engages in cultural and environmental preservation for a particular country

National trust organizations
 National Trust of Australia
National Trust of Queensland
National Trust of Australia (Victoria)
 Bahamas National Trust
 National Trust of Guernsey
 National Trust for Jersey
 National Trust for Scotland
 National Trust for Historic Preservation in the United States
 National Trust for Ireland

Politics
 National Trust Party (Iran)
 National Trust Party (Malaysia)

Other uses
 National Trust Company, a former business in Canada
 The National Trust (band), a US musical project
 National Trust (typeface), the National Trust's corporate typeface

See also
 An Taisce, the National Trust for Ireland
 Trust (social sciences), as directed towards a nation or its government
 Trust (disambiguation)
 Trust company, a corporation organized to perform the fiduciary of trusts and agencies